"Are You Sure?" is a song by Dutch DJ and record producer trio Kris Kross Amsterdam and English singer-songwriter Conor Maynard, featuring vocals from American singer, rapper, songwriter and record producer Ty Dolla Sign. The song samples "Who Do You Love" by American musician Bernard Wright. The song was released as a digital download on 23 December 2016 through Spinnin' Records and Parlophone.

Track listing

Charts

Weekly charts

Year-end charts

Release history

References

2016 singles
2016 songs
2017 songs
Conor Maynard songs
Spinnin' Records singles
Parlophone singles
Songs written by Ty Dolla Sign